Le Procès Veauradieux (The Veauradieux Trial) is an 1875 farce written by Alfred Hennequin and Alfred Delacour. It was one of the major successes of Hennequin's career.

Background and first production
Alfred Hennequin had a success with his farce Les trois chapeaux, produced at the Théâtre du Vaudeville, Paris in 1871, but  as Le Figaro later commented, "in Paris, the difficulty is not writing amusing plays – it is getting them played". Hennequin's next success was not until June 1875. He collaborated with Alfred Delacour on a three-act farce, Le Procès Veauradieux (The Veauradieux Trial). The Vaudeville was officially closed for the customary summer break, and Paris was in the middle of a heatwave, but the members of the theatre's company decided to stage the play regardless of their management. It opened on 19 June 1875 and ran for 175 performances, at a time when a run of more than 100 performances was regarded as a success in Parisian theatres.

Original cast

Gastinel – Auguste Parade
Fauvinard – Saint-Germain
Tardivant – Alfred Dieudonné
De Bagnolle – Édouard Georges
Mme Laiguisier – Mme Alexis
Césarine – Léontine Massin
Mme de Bagnolle – Mlle Germinie
Angèle – Mlle Delta
Isidore-Fanchette – Mlle Lamare
Thérèse – Mlle Marcelle
Sophie – Mlle Andréa
Source: Les Annales du théâtre et de la musique and Les Archives du spectacle.

Synopsis

Fauvinard is a Parisian lawyer, with a bullying mother-in-law. He and his colleague Tardivaut fabricate a case – the Veauradieux trial – to create an alibi for their extramarital affairs. It chances that both their mistresses live in the same apartment block, and that, unknown to them, Tardivaut's mistress, Zizi, has another admirer: Fauvinard's lecherous but narcoleptic uncle. Fauvinard's mistress, Césarine, also has another admirer, whose wife is Fauvinard's client in her divorce suit. Circumstances bring all the main characters together in Césarine's flat, where the urgent necessity to avoid being found there causes frenetic exits and entrances, offstage savagings by Césarine's man-hating pet dog, and adoption of fictitious identities. Eventually all is safely resolved, and the men are back under the supervision of their wives (and mothers-in-law) convinced that dissipation does not suit them.

Reception
The authors of Les Annales du théâtre et de la musique wrote:

In Le Figaro Auguste Vitu wrote, "M. Delacour and M. Hennequin won the Veauradieux Trial, with interest, damages and costs; we laughed for two hours, laughed as in the good old days of the Vaudeville, as at the best evenings of the Palais-Royal, we laughed like a herd of madmen".

Revivals and adaptations
Dion Boucicault adapted the play as Forbidden Fruit, premiered on Broadway in 1876,
That version was given in the West End in 1880, but the first version of Le Procès Veauradieux seen in London was The Great Divorce Case by "John Doe and Richard Roe" (later revealed to be Clement Scott and Arthur Mattison), successfully produced by Charles Wyndham at the Criterion Theatre, London, in April 1876. That version, which was suitably toned down to satisfy the Lord Chamberlain (the official censor) and the Victorian public, was translated back into French so that a French troupe, led by Didier and Schey, could perform the more respectable version during their 1876 season in London: the Lord Chamberlain declined to license Delacour and Hennequin's original. Wyndham presented The Great Divorce Case on Broadway in 1883.

Le Procès Veauradieux was revived in London in 2010 at the Orange Tree Theatre under the title Once Bitten.

Notes, references and sources

Notes

References

Sources

 
 
 
 

French plays
1875 plays
Comedy plays